Singapore participated in the 2014 Asian Games in Incheon, South Korea from 19 September to 4 October 2014.

On 20 September, Lim Wei Wen won a bronze medal in fencing for the men's individual épée competition.

On 21 September, Joseph Schooling won a bronze medal for swimming in the men's 200m butterfly with a time of 1:57.54 minutes.

On 22 September, Tao Li won a silver medal for swimming in the women's 50m butterfly with a time of 26.28 seconds, missing out on a third consecutive Asian Games gold for the 50m butterfly.

Also on 22 September, the men's doubles team for Sepak Takraw were bronze medalists. The Laos team were disqualified for failure to play their semi-final match. Singapore had the best record of the teams that were eliminated from progression to the semi-finals, which was the fifth best record of all teams after the group stage. The team consisted of Mohamad Farhan Amran, Muhammad Hafiz Nor Izam Ja'afar and Eddy Nor Shafiq Sahari.

On 24 September, Schooling won Singapore's first gold medal at the 2014 Games, finishing first at the 100m butterfly final. He was the first male Singaporean swimmer to win a gold medal at the Asian Games, since Ang Peng Siong’s gold medal at the men's 100m freestyle at the 1982 Asiad in New Delhi.

Media coverage
Singaporean public broadcasting conglomerate Mediacorp held the broadcast rights of the 2014 Asian Games in the country.

Medalists

References

Nations at the 2014 Asian Games
2014
Asian Games